The Women's 5,000 metres event at the 2005 World Championships was held on August 10 and August 13 at the Helsinki Olympic Stadium.

Medalists

Heats

Heat 1
  Tirunesh Dibaba, Ethiopia 14:50.98 Q
  Meselech Melkamu, Ethiopia 14:51.49 Q
  Joanne Pavey, Great Britain 14:53.82 Q
  Prisca Jepleting Ngetich, Kenya 14:54.50 Q (SB)
  Marta Domínguez, Spain 14:56.02 q
  Volha Kravtsova, Belarus 14:56.16 q (NR)
  Zakia Mrisho Mohamed, Tanzania 14:57.22 q (NR)
  Sun Yingjie, China 14:58.34 q (SB)
  Kayoko Fukushi, Japan 15:05.77 q
  Lauren Fleshman, United States 15:32.05
  Veerle Dejaeghere, Belgium 15:47.01
  Maryna Dubrova, Ukraine 16:01.88
  Anesie Kwizera, Burundi 16:06.66 (NR)
  Catherine Chikwakwa, Malawi 16:11.63 (SB)
  Jessica Augusto, Portugal 16:23.66

Heat 2
  Meseret Defar, Ethiopia 15:13.52 Q
  Ejegayehu Dibaba, Ethiopia 15:14.33 Q
  Xing Huina, China 15:14.48 Q (SB)
  Liliya Shobukhova, Russia 15:14.63 Q
  Isabella Ochichi, Kenya 15:16.51 q
  Susanne Wigene, Norway 15:18.38 q
  Shalane Flanagan, United States 15:20.59
  Maria Protopappa, Greece 15:32.04
  Amy Rudolph, United States 15:32.73
  Margaret Maury, France 15:35.65
  Dulce Maria Rodriguez, Mexico 15:44.65 (SB)
  Anikó Kálovics, Hungary 15:46.36
  Simret Sultan, Eritrea 15:47.46
  Maria McCambridge, Ireland 16:05.44
  Miriam Kaumba, Zambia 16:10.70

Final
  Tirunesh Dibaba, Ethiopia 14:38.59 (CR)
  Meseret Defar, Ethiopia 14:39.54
  Ejegayehu Dibaba, Ethiopia 14:42.47
  Meselech Melkamu, Ethiopia 14:43.47
  Xing Huina, China 14:43.64 (PB)
  Zakia Mrisho Mohamed, Tanzania 14:43.87 (NR)
  Prisca Jepleting Ngetich, Kenya 14:44.00 (PB)
  Isabella Ochichi, Kenya 14:45.14 (PB)
  Liliya Shobukhova, Russia 14:47.07 (PB)
  Volha Kravtsova, Belarus 14:47.75 (NR)
  Sun Yingjie, China 14:51.19 (SB)
  Kayoko Fukushi, Japan 14:59.92
  Susanne Wigene, Norway 15:00.23
  Marta Domínguez, Spain 15:02.30
  Joanne Pavey, Great Britain 15:14.37

External links
IAAF results (heats)
IAAF results (final)
Results–World Athletics

50 km walk
5000 metres at the World Athletics Championships
2005 in women's athletics